P. K. Sawant was appointed interim Chief Minister of Maharashtra, on the death of Marotrao Kannamwar. Sawant held the office for nine days from 25 November 1963 to 4 December 1963, when he was replaced by Congress' new leader, Vasantrao Naik. This ministry had the shortest tenure in Maharashtra until 2019, when Devendra Fadnavis's second government lasted for about three days.

References

Indian National Congress
S
S
Cabinets established in 1963
Cabinets disestablished in 1963